Shalghami may refer to any of three villages in Pol Khatun Rural District, Marzdaran District, Sarakhs County, Razavi Khorasan Province, Iran:
 Shalghami-ye Olya
 Shalghami-ye Sofla